The 1981 Holy Cross Crusaders football team was an American football team that represented the College of the Holy Cross as an independent during the 1981 NCAA Division I-A football season. The team was led by a new head coach, Rick E. Carter. The team compiled a record of 6–5.

This would be Holy Cross' last season in the NCAA's top level of competition. Shortly after the season ended, the NCAA reassigned the Crusaders, along with several other football teams, to Division I-AA now known as the Football Championship Subdivision.

All 1981 home games were played at Fitton Field on the Holy Cross campus in Worcester, Massachusetts.

Schedule

Statistical leaders
Statistical leaders for the 1981 Crusaders included: 
 Rushing: Mark Covington, 763 yards and 11 touchdowns on 209 attempts
 Passing: Dave Boisture, 1,101 yards, 92 completions and 2 touchdowns on 178 attempts
 Receiving: Mike Redding, 363 yards on 31 receptions
 Scoring: Mark Covington, 66 points from 11 touchdowns
 Total offense: Dave Boisture, 1,254 yards (1,101 passing, 153 rushing)
 All-purpose yards: (tie) 785 yards for Andy Clivio (564 rushing, 208 returning, 13 receiving) and Mark Covington (763 rushing, 22 receiving)
 Interceptions: Rob Porter, 5 interceptions for 35 yards
 Tackles: Harry Flaherty, 101 total tackles

References

Holy Cross
Holy Cross Crusaders football seasons
Holy Cross Crusaders football